Gajanan Kathaley (22 November 1946 – 24 October 2014) was an Indian cricketer. He played four first-class matches for Vidarbha between 1972 and 1974.

References

External links
 

1946 births
2014 deaths
Indian cricketers
Vidarbha cricketers
Cricketers from Nagpur